Cylindrepomus cicindeloides is a species of beetle in the family Cerambycidae. It was described by Schwarzer in 1926.

References

Dorcaschematini
Beetles described in 1926